Paul J. Failla (born December 8, 1972) is a former American football and baseball player and coach.

College career
Failla was recruited out of North Allegheny Senior High School in Wexford, Pennsylvania by the University of Notre Dame, where he was a two-sport athlete, playing shortstop for the baseball team, and backing up starting quarterbacks Rick Mirer and Kevin McDougal on the football team for three years, from 1991–1993. In 1992, he played collegiate summer baseball with the Brewster Whitecaps of the Cape Cod Baseball League. When it became clear that he would not win the starting quarterback job in 1994, he entered the Major League Baseball Draft, and was selected by the California Angels in the third round.

Following stints with the Boise Hawks, the Cedar Rapids Kernels and the Lake Elsinore Storm in the minor-league system, he decided to return to school in 1998, and used his final year of NCAA eligibility playing quarterback at the Indiana University of Pennsylvania, where he led the team to a 10–2 record and a playoff berth.

Professional career
After his graduation from IUP, Failla signed with the Arena Football League's New Jersey Red Dogs in 1999, and with the National Football League's Carolina Panthers in 2000, but failed to record a stat with either team.  In 2001, he was drafted by the Chicago Enforcers of the XFL with the ninth overall selection, but lost the starting quarterback job to fellow Notre Dame alum Kevin McDougal.

After the XFL folded at the conclusion of its only season, Failla accepted the position of offensive coordinator at Saint Francis University, where in the 2005 season his offense set school records for passing yards (3,223), total offense (4,479) and touchdowns (37). He groomed multiple all-conference players including quarterback Anthony Doria (NEC offensive player of the year), wide receiver Luke Palko, running back Todd Harris, and Division I-AA All-American wide receiver Micheal Caputo and Quarterback / wide receiver Joe DeLeo. Under Failla, Palko and Caputo tied the NCAA Division I record for most passes caught by two teammates in a career. He then returned to his alma mater at IUP in February 2006 as the offensive coordinator under head coach Lou Tepper, but resigned three months later to pursue business interests. He is currently featured as a regular guest on Pittsburgh's KDKA Sports Showdown.

References 

1972 births
Living people
American football quarterbacks
Brewster Whitecaps players
Chicago Enforcers players
IUP Crimson Hawks football coaches
IUP Crimson Hawks football players
Notre Dame Fighting Irish football players
Notre Dame Fighting Irish baseball players
Minor league baseball players
Saint Francis Red Flash football coaches
People from Allegheny County, Pennsylvania
Sportspeople from Los Angeles County, California
Players of American football from Pennsylvania